is a Japanese actress.

Filmography

Movie
Dark Water (2002)
Godzilla: Tokyo S.O.S. (2003)
Be with You (いま、会いにゆきます, Ima, ai ni yukimasu) (2004)
Godzilla: Final Wars (2004)
Female (2005)
Radiance (2017)

Television
Attention Please (2006)
Yamada Taro Monogatari (TBS, 2007)

Voice Acting roles
Yakitate!! Japan - Azusagawa Tsukino

Voice Dubbing roles
Racing Stripes - Channing "Chan" Walsh (2005)
Dumbo - Miss Atlantis (2019)
Arlo the Alligator Boy - Bertie

Musical
Cinderella Story - Cinderella (2003-2005)
Mozart! - Constanze (2005)
Dance of the Vampires - Sarah (2005-2009), Magda (2019)
How to Succeed in Business Without Really Trying - Rosemary Pilkington (2006-2007)
Rebecca - I (2008-2019)
Zorro - Luisa (2011)
Love Letters – Melissa (2012)
Fiddler on the Roof - Hodel (2013)
The Beautiful Game - Mary (2014)
In the Heights - Vanessa (2014)
Carmen - Catalina (2014)
The Pajama Game - Gladys Hotchkiss (2017)
Matilda - Mrs. Wormwood (2023)

References

External links
 Official blog 
 Official agency profile 
 
 

1986 births
Living people
Horikoshi High School alumni
Voice actors from Tokushima Prefecture
People from Tokushima (city)
Japanese film actresses
Japanese musical theatre actresses
Japanese television actresses
Japanese voice actresses
21st-century Japanese actresses